Muhammed al-Ajami could refer to:

 Mohammed al-Ajami, Qatari poet
 Muhammed al-Ajami, a Muslim saint whose shrine is located in the former Palestinian village of al-Majdal, Tiberias